Artūrs Visockis-Rubenis (born August 11, 1985) is a Latvian professional basketball coach, who is currently a head coach for BK Liepāja, and an assistant for Luca Banchi in Latvian National Team.

Career
From 2011 till 2016 he worked as a head coach of Latvijas Universitāte, reaching Latvian League semi-finals in his debut season. From 2016 till 2019 he worked as head coach for BK Ogre, guiding them to first Latvian league medals in club's history. In summer of 2019 Visockis-Rubenis signed with 10-time Latvian champions BK Ventspils and debuted in FIBA Europe Cup level helping the team to reach the quarterfinals. In summer of 2020 Visockis-Rubenis became a head coach for BK Liepāja, signing a multi-year contract.

National teams
In 2015 he was named Latvian U16 team head coach  and led the team in 2016 FIBA Europe Under-16 Championship.

From 2015 Visockis-Rubenis is also an assistant coach of Latvia women's national basketball team, participating in EuroBasket Women 2017 (6th place) and 2018 FIBA Women's Basketball World Cup. In 2017, Visockis-Rubenis was also appointed as an assistant for Men's National Team, participating in EuroBasket 2017 (5th place) and 2019 FIBA Basketball World Cup qualification.

In 2018 Visockis-Rubenis was named Latvian U18 head coach and led his team to historical 2018 FIBA Europe Under-18 Championship silver - it was the first time Latvian U18 team went to the final. Team qualified for 2019 FIBA Under-19 Basketball World Cup. Later that year federation named Visockis-Rubenis also the head coach of U19 National Team for World Cup.

In 2020 he was again appointed a head coach for Latvian U-18 National team.

Honors and awards

Club career
 BK Ogre (2016-2019)
 Latvian Basketball League Bronze: (2019)
 BK Ventspils (2019–2020)
 Latvian Basketball League Bronze: (2020)

Individual
 Latvian Coach of the Year: (2018)

National Team
 FIBA Europe U-18 Championship Runner Up: (2018)

References

1985 births
Living people
Latvian basketball coaches
University of Latvia
Sportspeople from Riga